Steven M. Berlin (born September 14, 1955, Philadelphia) is an American saxophonist, keyboardist and record producer, best known as a member of the rock group Los Lobos and, before that, Top Jimmy & the Rhythm Pigs, the Blasters, and the Flesh Eaters. Berlin is married and lives with his wife and children in Portland, Oregon. Berlin joined the band Tuatara as a side project in 1998 on their second album, Trading with the Enemy.

As either a session musician or producer, Berlin has worked with the Crash Test Dummies, Backyard Tire Fire, The Beat Farmers, John Lee Hooker, the Paladins, Faith No More, Dave Alvin, R.E.M., the Go-Go's, the Smithereens, the Replacements, Leo Kottke, Sheryl Crow, the Act, Los Super Seven, Rickie Lee Jones, Leftover Salmon, String Cheese Incident, Alec Ounsworth (Clap Your Hands Say Yeah), Raul Malo, Rick Trevino, Jackie Greene, the Tragically Hip, Great Big Sea, the Bridge, Nathan Wiley, the Dandy Warhols, Making Movies, No Te Va Gustar, Brownout and Deer Tick.

References

External links
 

1955 births
Living people
American keyboardists
American rock saxophonists
American male saxophonists
American session musicians
Musicians from Philadelphia
Los Lobos members
The Blasters members
The Minus 5 members
Tuatara (band) members
The Flesh Eaters members
The Plugz members
21st-century American saxophonists
21st-century American male musicians